Vorkapić is a village in central Croatia, in the municipality of Topusko, Sisak-Moslavina County.

Demographics
According to the 2011 census, the village of Vorkapić has 26 inhabitants. This represents 12.56% of its pre-war population according to the 1991 census.

According to the 1991 census,  99.03% of the village population were ethnic Serbs (205/207), 0.48% were ethnic Croats (1/207), and 0.48% were of other ethnic origin (1/207).

Sights
 Monument to the uprising of the people of Kordun and Banija

See also 
 Glina massacres

References

Populated places in Sisak-Moslavina County
Serb communities in Croatia